Corymica specularia is a moth of the family Geometridae first described by Frederic Moore in 1867. It is found in Sri Lanka, India and Taiwan.

It is generally a yellow moth with brownish tips of the forewings. Two subspecies are recognized:
Corymica specularia crocina Wehrli, 1939
Corymica specularia nea Wehrli, 1939

References

Moths of Asia
Moths described in 1867